During the 2004–05 German football season, 1. FSV Mainz 05 competed in the Bundesliga.

Season summary
A solid first-ever season in Germany's top flight saw Mainz comfortably qualify for the next season's Bundesliga with an 11th-placed finish. Furthermore, the team were awarded Germany's fair play award - because Germany were awarded an extra spot in the UEFA Cup through the Fair Play draw, Mainz qualified for the UEFA Cup's first round.

First-team squad
Squad at end of season

Left club during season

References

Notes

1. FSV Mainz 05 seasons
German football clubs 2004-05 season